The Milner Pass Road Camp Mess Hall and House was built in 1926 was built to support construction crews working on the new Trail Ridge Road in the vicinity of Milner Pass in Rocky Mountain National Park in 1926.  The  log structure was designed by Daniel Ray Hull of the National Park Service and represents one of the earliest examples of the National Park Service rustic style in the park. The interior is divided into three rooms. Its original use was as a dining facility and residence for Park Service personnel.

The Milner Pass Mess Hall was placed on the National Register of Historic Places on July 20, 1987.

See also
National Register of Historic Places listings in Grand County, Colorado

References

Houses on the National Register of Historic Places in Colorado
National Park Service rustic in Colorado
National Register of Historic Places in Rocky Mountain National Park
Houses completed in 1926
Houses in Grand County, Colorado
Park buildings and structures on the National Register of Historic Places in Colorado
National Register of Historic Places in Grand County, Colorado
1926 establishments in Colorado